Anastasia Polibina (born 30 June 2000) is a Polish ice dancer. With her skating partner, Pavel Golovishnikov, she is the 2022 Bosphorus Cup champion, 2022 NRW Trophy silver medalist, and 2023 Polish national champion.

Career

Early years 
Polibina began learning to skate in 2004.

In 2015, she teamed up with Radosław Barszczak to compete for Poland in ice dancing. The two made their international debut in September, placing 17th at an ISU Junior Grand Prix event in Toruń, Poland.

2017–18 season 
Polibina/Barszczak's senior debut came in November 2017, at the Volvo Open Cup in Riga, Latvia. Later that month, they placed 12th at two ISU Challenger Series events — the 2017 CS Warsaw Cup and 2017 CS Tallinn Trophy. In December, they finished ninth at the Santa Claus Cup in Hungary, and then took bronze at the Polish Championships.

2020–21 season 
Polibina teamed up with Russian ice dancer Pavel Golovishnikov to skate for Poland. The two decided to train in Toruń under Sylwia Nowak-Trębacka. In December 2020, they became the Polish national silver medalists at the Four Nationals in Cieszyn. They had no appearances at ISU events in their first season together.

2021–22 season 
In October 2021, Polibina/Golovishnikov placed fourth at the Mezzaluna Cup in Italy and then won bronze at the Viktor Petrenko Cup in Odesa, Ukraine. In November, they finished 13th at the 2021 CS Warsaw Cup.

In December, competing at Four Nationals, they repeated as national silver medalists. They were assigned to the 2022 European Championships but withdrew before the event due to a positive test for SARS-CoV-2. They placed 28th at the 2022 World Championships, which took place in March in Montpellier, France.

2022–23 season 
In November, Polibina/Golovishnikov took silver at the NRW Trophy in Germany. In December, they won gold at the Bosphorus Cup in Turkey and then claimed the Polish national title at the Four National Championships hosted by Hungary. They were subsequently nominated to compete at the 2023 European Championships in Espoo, Finland.

Programs

With Golovishnikov

With Barszczak

Competitive highlights 
CS: Challenger Series; JGP: Junior Grand Prix

With Golovishnikov

With Barszczak

References

External links 
 
 
 

2000 births
Living people
Figure skaters from Moscow
Polish female ice dancers
Russian emigrants to Poland